Robert de Welles, 2nd Baron de Welles, Constable of Pendragon Castle was the son of Adam de Welles, 1st Lord of Welles (1249–1311) and Joan d'Engayne (1265–1315). He married Maud de Clare, daughter of Thomas de Clare, Lord of Thomond (1245–1287) in 1315 without royal licence. It is said that he did, in fact, have a daughter by Maud de Clare, but historical evidence remains elusive. The Barony de Welles passed to his brother, Adam de Welles, 3rd Baron Welles (1304–1345) on his death. He is buried at Greenfield Priory, Greenfield, East Lindsey District, Lincolnshire, England.

References

1296 births
1320 deaths
Barons in the Peerage of England